The 1932 United States presidential election in North Carolina took place on November 8, 1932, as part of the 1932 United States presidential election. North Carolina voters chose 13 representatives, or electors, to the Electoral College, who voted for president and vice president.

North Carolina was won by Governor Franklin D. Roosevelt (D–New York), running with Speaker John Nance Garner, with 69.93 percent of the popular vote, against incumbent President Herbert Hoover (R–California), running with Vice President Charles Curtis, with 29.28 percent of the popular vote.

Results

Results by county

References

North Carolina
1932
1932 North Carolina elections